The Swedish Film Institute was founded in 1963 to support and develop the Swedish film industry. The institute is housed in the Filmhuset building located in Gärdet, Östermalm in Stockholm. The building, completed in 1970, was designed by architect Peter Celsing.

Function 
The Swedish Film Institute supports Swedish filmmaking and allocates grants for production, distribution and public showing of Swedish films in Sweden. It also promotes Swedish cinema internationally. Furthermore, the Institute organises the annual Guldbagge Awards. The Swedish Film Database is published by the institute.

Through the Swedish Film Agreement, between the Swedish state and the film and media industry, the Government of Sweden, the TV companies which were party to the agreement, and Sweden's cinema owners jointly fund the Film Institute and thus, indirectly, Swedish filmmaking. The agreement ran from January 1, 2006, until December 31, 2012. The building also contains a large film archive and two theatres, named after Victor Sjöström and Mauritz Stiller, which regularly arrange screenings of classic films.

Managing directors 
1963–1970 Harry Schein (1924–2006)
1970–1972 Bo Jonsson (b. 1938)
1972–1978 Harry Schein (1924–2006)
1978–1982 Jörn Donner (1933-2020)
1982–1989 Klas Olofsson
1989–1994 Ingrid Edström (b. 1931)
1994–1998 Lars Engqvist (b. 1945)
1998–1999 Hans Ottosson
1999–2006 Åse Kleveland (b. 1949)
2006–2010 Cissi Elwin Frenkel (b. 1965)
2010–2011 Bengt Toll
2011–2021 Anna Serner

Chairmen of the Board 
1963–1967 Krister Wickman (1924–93)
1967–1970 Roland Pålsson
1970–1978 Harry Schein (1924–2006)
1978–1981 Per Ahlmark (b. 1939)
1981–1984 Bert Levin
1984–1992 Hans Löwbeer (1923–2004)
1992–1999 Åke Ahrsjö (b. 1929)
1999–2005 Lisa Söderberg
2005–2011 Håkan Tidlund
2012–2014 Göran K Johansson
2015–present Claes Ånstrand

Centres 
The Swedish Film Institute has centres for film resources and production respectively:

Film Resource 
Film i Dalarna (Dalarna County)
Film på Gotland (Gotland County)
Region Gävleborg (Gävleborg County)
Region Halland (Halland County)
Film i Jönköpings län (Jönköping County)
Film i Skåne (Skåne County) (used for both resource and production)
Film Stockholm (Stockholm County)
Film i Sörmland (Södermanland County)
Landstinget i Uppsala län (Uppsala County)
Region Värmland (Värmland County)
Film i Västerbotten (Västerbotten County)
Landstinget Västmanland (Västmanland County)
Film i Västernorrland (Västernorrland County)
Film i Örebro län (Örebro County)
Filmpool Jämtland (Jämtland County)
Film i Öst (Östergötland County)
Filmpool Nord (Norrbotten County) (used for both resource and production)
Region Västra Götaland (Västra Götaland County)
Filmregion Sydost (Blekinge County, Kronoberg County and Kalmar County)

Production 
Film i Väst (Västra Götaland County)
Filmregion Stockholm-Mälardalen (Stockholm County)

Used for both film resource & production

See also 
 Trollywood
 Finnish Film Foundation
 American Film Institute
 ACE – Association of European Film Archives and Cinematheques

References

External links 

The Swedish Film Institute

 
Film production companies of Sweden
Film archives in Europe
Film organizations in Sweden
FIAF-affiliated institutions